Notable people named Rudolf Holzapfel include:

Rudolf Maria Holzapfel (1874–1930), a Polish-Austrian psychologist and philosopher
Rudolf Melander Holzapfel (1900–1982), a Shakespeareean scholar and art dealer
Rudi Holzapfel (1938–2005), an Irish poet and teacher; son of Rudolf Melander

See also
Holzapfel
Rudolph (name)